Physogaleus is a small genus of prehistoric shark that lived from the Eocene to Miocene epochs.

Description
Physogaleus are only known from their fossil teeth and isolated vertebra. It has teeth similar to the modern tiger shark, but smaller. Species of Physogaleus were originally described as being teeth of extinct tiger shark species in the genus Galeocerdo. Recognition of numerous differences in tooth anatomies of these species with other species of Galeocerdo lead researchers to erect the genus Physogaleus.

Physogaleus teeth are smaller than those of true tiger sharks, lacking the heavy serrations typical of Galeocerdo, are more slender and can be twisted toward the crown. This indicates individuals of Physogaleus probably had a diet of bony fish, similar to the living sand-tiger shark.

References

Eocene sharks
Prehistoric fish of Africa